Francavilla Calcio may refer to 3 Italian football clubs:

A.S.D. Francavilla, based in Francavilla al Mare (CH), Abruzzo
F.C. Francavilla, based in Francavilla in Sinni (PZ), Basilicata
Virtus Francavilla Calcio, based in Francavilla Fontana (BR), Apulia

See also
Francavilla (disambiguation)